The 2014 Oklahoma Sooners football team represented the University of Oklahoma in the 2014 NCAA Division I FBS football season, the 120th season of Sooner football. The team was led by two-time Walter Camp Coach of the Year Award winner, Bob Stoops, in his 16th season as head coach. They played their home games at Gaylord Family Oklahoma Memorial Stadium in Norman, Oklahoma. They were a member of the Big 12 Conference.

Oklahoma, entered the 2014 season ranked 4th in AP Poll and were projected to capture their first Big 12 title since 2012, finishing 1st in the Big 12 media poll. The Sooners won their first four games of the season, before being upset by then-No. 25 TCU. The team also lost to then-No. 14 Kansas State two weeks later & then to No. 10 Baylor, which was the first and only win in Norman for the Bears to date. The Sooners recovered and won their next two games, which included a record-setting performance from freshman running back Samaje Perine, who ran for 427 yards, which broke the single-game rushing record set a week prior by Wisconsin's Melvin Gordon. They entered the season finale against Oklahoma State at 8–3 and ranked 18th in the AP Poll. However, the Sooners lost in overtime, giving the Cowboys their first win in Bedlam since 2011, which also earned them bowl eligibility and their first win in Norman since 2001. Oklahoma finished out the regular season with an 8–4 record, 5–4 in Big 12 play to finish in a three-way tie for fourth place. The Sooners were invited to play in the Russell Athletic Bowl against the Clemson Tigers, where they were defeated by a score of 40–6.

Following the season, Jordan Phillips was selected in the second round of the 2015 NFL Draft, along with Geneo Grissom in the third, Daryl Williams and Blake Bell in the fourth, and Tyrus Thompson and Aaron Ripkowski in the sixth.

Preseason

Recruits

Award watch lists

John Mackey Award
Blake Bell
Taylor McNamara

Lou Groza Award
 Michael Hunnicutt

Lombardi Award
Eric Striker

Jim Thorpe Award
Zack Sanchez

Butkus Award
Frank Shannon
Eric Striker

Maxwell Award
Trevor Knight

Rimington Trophy
 Ty Darlington

Outland Trophy
Daryl Williams

Davey O'Brien Award
Trevor Knight

Chuck Bednarik Award
Frank Shannon
Eric Striker
Charles Tapper

Walter Camp Award
Trevor Knight

Bronko Nagurski Trophy
Zack Sanchez
Eric Striker
Charles Tapper

Schedule

Roster

Depth chart

Game summaries

Louisiana Tech

Tulsa

Tennessee

West Virginia

TCU

Texas (Red River Showdown)

Kansas State

Iowa State

Baylor

Texas Tech

Kansas

Kickoff was delayed from the original start time of 11:00 AM to 12:30 PM due to lightning and thunderstorms in the vicinity of the University of Oklahoma. Oklahoma true freshman running back Samaje Perine broke the NCAA single-game rushing record in this game, recording 427 yards and five touchdowns on 34 carries. Perine broke Wisconsin running back Melvin Gordon's record — which only stood for seven days — on a 42-yard run early in the fourth quarter. The yardage also allowed him to become OU's single-game leading rusher, breaking the mark previously owned by Greg Pruitt (294 yards vs. Kansas State, October 23, 1971). It was the third game of the season in which Perine rushed for more than 200 yards.

Oklahoma State (Bedlam Series)

Clemson (Russell Athletic Bowl)

Rankings

Statistics

Team

Most points given up in Stoops era
Least sacks allowed since 2004
Smallest average margin of victory (10.5), least passing touchdowns and lowest passing completion percentage since 2005
Least rushing yards per game given up since 2006
Least passing completions and third down conversions since 2006
Highest passing completion percentage allowed since 2007
Least field goals made and attempted since 2008
Most rushing touchdowns since 2008
Most first downs, total touchdowns and passing completions given up since 2008
Least rushing first downs, rushing yards and yards per rush given up since 2009
Highest fourth down conversion rate allowed since 2009
Lowest field goal conversion rate since 2009

Scores by quarter

Most second quarter points allowed since 2008
Least second quarter points scored since 2009

Postseason

Coaching changes

 On January 4, 2015, co-offensive coordinator and receivers coach Jay Norvell was fired.
 On January 6, 2015, co-offensive coordinator and quarterbacks coach Josh Heupel was fired.
 On January 12, 2015, assistant head coach and cornerbacks coach Bobby Jack Wright announced his retirement from coaching.
 On January 12, 2015, East Carolina offensive coordinator Lincoln Riley was hired as Oklahoma offensive coordinator and quarterbacks coach.
 On February 4, 2015, Washington State wide receivers coach Dennis Simmons was hired as Oklahoma outside receivers coach.
 On February 9, 2015, Notre Dame defensive backs coach Kerry Cooks was hired as Oklahoma defensive backs coach.
 On February 10, 2015, defensive line coach Jerry Montgomery left Oklahoma to become a defensive front assistant for the Green Bay Packers.
 On February 19, 2015, Stanford defensive assistant Diron Reynolds was hired as defensive line coach.

2015 NFL Draft

The 2015 NFL Draft was held at Auditorium Theatre in Chicago on April 30 through May 2, 2015. The following Oklahoma players were either selected or signed as free agents following the draft.

References

Oklahoma
Oklahoma Sooners football seasons
Oklahoma Sooners football